Protuberum is an extinct genus of traversodontid cynodonts known from a single species Protuberum cabralense, from the Middle Triassic of Brazil.

As with all genera of the family Traversodontidae, Protuberum was a herbivore, with a specialized grinding action when feeding. The two known specimens were collected a number of years apart from sediments of the Alemoa Member of the Santa Maria Formation in Geopark of Paleorrota, Rio Grande do Sul, Brazil.  The first specimen was collected in 1977 and consists of several ribs and vertebrae.  The second specimen, collected in 1989, consists of a partial articulated skeleton and a skull.  Both specimens were collected by Father Daniel Cargnin. The genus name is in reference to the large amount of protuberances on the ribs and ilia, while the species name is in honor of the Municipality of Novo Cabrais, where the type specimen was collected.

References

Traversodontids
Prehistoric cynodont genera
Middle Triassic synapsids of South America
Fossil taxa described in 2009
Santa Maria Formation